Boulder Bridge is an area of land adjacent to a large bird sanctuary run by the Royal Society for the Protection of Birds. The area is synonymous with a number of large scrap yards that specialise, for the most part, in recycling cars and commercial vehicles, mainly buses. The area is the biggest commercial vehicle recycling base in the UK and is located between the small villages of Shafton and Carlton.

In the past Barnsley Metropolitan Borough Council have battled hard to stop the illegal burning of buses on many of these yards and the environmental impact of them is still contentious.

Geography of Barnsley